Coherence theory may refer to

 Coherence theory (optics), the study of optical effects arising from partially coherent electromagnetic radiation 
 Coherence theory of truth, regards truth as coherence within some specified set of sentences, propositions or beliefs
 Weak central coherence theory, posits that persons on the autism spectrum have only limited ability to understand context, to "see the big picture"

See also
 Coherentism, two approaches to philosophical epistemology